Tortyra cantharodes is a moth of the family Choreutidae. It is known from Peru.

The wingspan is about 18 mm. The forewings are metallic-green, with strong coppery-purple reflection and a slight black strigula from the costa near the base, as well as a narrow almost straight iridescent-blue-metallic fascia before the middle, edged on each side with blackish and then with a narrow even fascia of dark fuscous whitish-tipped scales, the posterior somewhat broader. The hindwings are dark fuscous.

References

Tortyra
Moths described in 1922